Junction 10, formerly Ten Mile Junction, is a shopping centre in Bukit Panjang, Singapore located at the junction of Choa Chu Kang Road and Woodlands Road.

Background
The mall was opened in 1998 as Ten Mile Junction. It is owned by Far East Organization.

It was accessible via the then-operational Ten Mile Junction LRT station, on the Bukit Panjang LRT line, which was permanently closed since 13 January 2019. The platform was located on level 3 of the complex, which also houses the Ten Mile Junction Depot adjacent to the station.

The shopping mall was closed on 10 December 2010 and reopened on 30 December 2011 as Junction 10. It is stylized as JUNCT10N, similar to Junction 8 in Bishan.

After reopening, Junction 10 became a mixed-use development, together with The Tennery, a private housing estate occupying levels 4 and above. They consists of 338 innovative SOHO-style loft apartments with a variety of recreational facilities such as open-air swimming pools and tennis courts.

It is currently anchored by Mindchamps Preschool, Fitness First (formerly Celebrity Fitness), and Sheng Siong (formerly occupied by Giant Hypermarket). In addition, the two-level mall is home to tuition centres, lifestyle shops, beauty & wellness services and family restaurants, and features an integrated car park.

References

External links
 
 

Shopping malls established in 1998
Shopping malls in Singapore
20th-century architecture in Singapore